Andriy Mykhailychenko (born 11 August 1981) is a Ukrainian gymnast. He competed at the 2004 Summer Olympics. In 1998, he won the bronze medal in the men's junior all-around event at the 1998 European Men's Artistic Gymnastics Championships held in Saint Petersburg, Russia.

References

External links
 

1981 births
Living people
Ukrainian male artistic gymnasts
Olympic gymnasts of Ukraine
Gymnasts at the 2004 Summer Olympics
Gymnasts from Saint Petersburg
21st-century Ukrainian people